During the timeframe of 2016 and 2021, various by-elections were held for the West Bengal Legislative Assembly.

The first by election was held in November 2016.

2016

2017
By-elections were held for Kanthi Dakshin and Sabang in 2017.

2018
By-election was held for Noapara and Maheshtala.

2019
By-election was held for eight assembly constituencies alongside the 2019 Lok Sabha election. BJP won four out of the eight seats, whereas AITC won three seats and INC won on one seat. Later Kaliaganj, Karimpur and Kharagpur Sadar were won by TMC candidates.

See also
 2016–21 Tamil Nadu Legislative Assembly by-elections

References

By-elections in India
State Assembly elections in West Bengal